The Nissan Diesel Space Runner A (kana:日産ディーゼル・スペースランナーA) was a heavy-duty single-decker bus produced by the Japanese manufacturer Nissan Diesel (now: UD Trucks) from 2007 until 2011. It can be either built as a complete bus or a bus chassis.

This is a rebadged Mitsubishi Fuso Aero Star.

The MD92TJ (and 5-speed manual) was adopted for PKG-AP..., and the 6M60 (and Alison 6-speed automatic) was adopted for LKG-AP....

A step-entrance (AP35...) was for both PKG-AP... and LKG-AP..., but a low-floor (AP37...) was only for LKG-AP....

Models 
PKG-AP35UK/UM/UP (2007)
LKG-AP35/37FK/FM/FP (2010)

References 

Bus chassis
Buses of Japan
Low-floor buses
Full-size buses
Step-entrance buses
Space Runner A
UD trucks
Vehicles introduced in 2007